"The lady doth protest too much, methinks" is a line from the play Hamlet by William Shakespeare. It is spoken by Queen Gertrude in response to the insincere overacting of a character in the play within a play created by Prince Hamlet to prove his uncle's guilt in the murder of his father, the King of Denmark.

The phrase is used in everyday speech to indicate doubt of someone's sincerity, especially regarding the truth of a strong denial. A common misquotation places methinks first, as in "methinks the lady doth protest too much".

In Hamlet
The line, like most of Shakespeare's works, is in iambic pentameter. It is found in Act III, Scene II of Hamlet, where it is spoken by Queen Gertrude, Hamlet's mother. Hamlet believes that his father, the king, was murdered by his uncle Claudius (who then married Gertrude). Hamlet decides to stage a play,  the Murder of Gonzago, that follows a similar sequence of events, in order to test whether viewing it will trigger a guilty conscience on the part of Claudius.

As Hamlet, Gertrude, Claudius and others watch the play-within-the-play, the Player Queen, representing Gertrude, declares in flowery language that she will never remarry if her husband dies. Hamlet then turns to his mother and asks her, "Madam, how like you this play?", to which she replies, "The lady doth protest too much, methinks", meaning that the Player Queen's protestations of love and fidelity are too excessive to be believed.

The quotation comes from the Second Quarto edition of the play. Later versions contain the simpler line, "The lady protests too much, methinks".

Later usage

The line's allusion to Gertrude's (lack of) fidelity to her husband has become a cliché of sexually fickle womanhood and a shorthand expression conveying doubt in a person's truthfulness, even when the subject is male. It is commonly used to imply that someone who denies something very strongly is hiding the truth; however, in the play, "protest" has the older meaning of "insist (that something is true), vow," not "deny." It is often shortened to "[X] protest[s] too much".

See also 

 Reaction formation

References 

Hamlet
Shakespearean phrases
English-language idioms